The Guthrey Archeological Site is a Native American archaeological site in Saline County, Missouri, located near the Missouri River east of the city of Miami, Missouri. The site was listed on the National Register of Historic Places in 1970.

Description
The Guthrey Site is the earliest known Oneota occupation area in Missouri. Oneota was a general cultural growth which developed in an area bounded by lines drawn from St Louis to Kansas City, due north to the Minnesota River, east to Aztalan (Wisconsin), and south to Cahokia in East St. Louis. Supported by a subsistence economy, the Oneota peoples hunted, fished, gardened, and gathered wild food plants.  Occupation dates are estimated as 1350 to 1400, with the possibility for both earlier and later habitation. Archaeological investigation was undertaken in the summer of 1964.

See also
National Register of Historic Places listings in Saline County, Missouri

References

Buildings and structures in Saline County, Missouri
Archaeological sites on the National Register of Historic Places in Missouri
National Register of Historic Places in Saline County, Missouri